Tombense Futebol Clube, commonly referred to as Tombense, is a Brazilian professional club based in Tombos, Minas Gerais founded on 7 September 1914.

History
The club was founded on 7 September 1914. They won the Campeonato Mineiro Segunda Divisão in 2002 and in 2006.

In 2014, the club was promoted to the third division after winning the fourth division. This was the club's first national title.

Honours
 Campeonato Brasileiro Série D
 Winners (1): 2014

 Campeonato Mineiro Segunda Divisão
 Winners (2): 2002, 2006

 Recopa Mineira
 Winners (2):''' 2021, 2022

Players

First team squad

Reserve team

Out on loan

References

Tombense Futebol Clube
Association football clubs established in 1914
Tombos
1914 establishments in Brazil
Campeonato Brasileiro Série D winners